Susie Green (born December 1957) is the former chief executive officer of Mermaids, a British advocacy organisation for gender variant and transgender youth. She stepped down unexpectedly on 25 November 2022 after six years of service.

Career
Green worked as an IT manager for Citizens Advice from 2002 to 2015 prior to her appointment as CEO of Mermaids in 2016. She stepped down as CEO in November 2022. Green worked with the actors and producers on a 2018 comedy drama by ITV, advising on the script and introducing them to some of the young people and parents she helps. She is involved with the WPATH on the children’s chapter that deals with children up to adolescence.

Personal life
Green lives in Yorkshire. She has four adult children, including twins, with her husband Tim. In 2017, Green presented a Ted Talk discussing the journey to gain gender affirmation surgery for her eldest child at age 16 in Thailand. Green met members of the British royal family at an event to acknowledge the contribution of those working in the mental health sector in the U.K.

References

1957 births
British LGBT rights activists
Living people